MS Pride of Hull is a Bahamas registered passenger and cargo roll-on/roll-off cruiseferry in service with P&O North Sea Ferries on the Hull – Rotterdam route.

Design
Pride of Hull was designed as two ships in one, both a car ferry and a cargo transporter, with three large freight decks, loaded by a single stern door and a car deck, on deck 7, loaded via a side ramp. She has two bow thrusters, two stabilisers and twin rudders. With Mampaey quick release disc type towing hook.

Service
On 11 March 2001, Norstar suffered a major engine room fire and was subsequently withdrawn from service upon arrival at Zeebrugge. As a result of this, the MS Norsun was required to go into refit early for subsequent transfer to the Kingston upon Hull – Zeebrugge as had been planned. The Hull – Rotterdam route operated with one British and one Dutch crew, the Dutch crew being assigned to Pride of Rotterdam and the British to Pride of Hull, as a result, in March 2001, with Pride of Hull having already been completed the names of the two vessels were swapped so that she could enter service as Pride of Rotterdam with the Dutch crew.

The newly renamed Pride of Hull was launched on 11 April 2001, finally being delivered to P&O Ferries on 16 November 2001. She was christened by Cherie Blair in Hull on 30 November 2001, entering service on 2 December 2001. Upon entering service she was the joint title holder of the World's Largest Cruiseferry with her sister, the Pride of Rotterdam

On 17 March 2022, P&O announced they were to fire 800 seafaring employees, including the entirety of the Pride of Hull’s crew, in a bid to save costs. In protest, the ship’s crew refused to leave, and Captain Eugene Favier raised the gangplank and refused access to P&O’s security, who were sent to forcefully remove the crew should they fail to leave the vessel. The standoff ended after five hours, when Captain Favier held discussions with P&O bosses, who agreed to provide the relevant documents to the crew, as requested by the National Union of Rail, Maritime and Transport Workers.

Engine room fires 
On 10 December 2008, Pride of Hull suffered a minor engine room fire whilst en route to Kingston upon Hull.

Another engine room fire broke out on 20 October 2020, this time en route to Rotterdam.

Sister ships
Pride of Hull has one sister ship:

Gallery

References

Ferries of the United Kingdom
Cruiseferries
2001 ships
Ships built by Fincantieri
Ships built in Venice
Merchant ships of the United Kingdom
Ships of P&O Ferries